The National Museum of Royal Barges is a museum in Bangkok, Thailand. It is on the northern rim of Bangkok Noi canal in the Bangkok Noi District.

Royal barges from the Royal Barge Procession are kept at the museum.

The museum was formerly a dry dock for barges and warships under the care of the Royal Household and the Royal Thai Navy. The dock and barges sustained severe bombing damage during World War II, but in 1949 they were restored by the Fine Arts Department as part of the Thai cultural heritage. Repairs were completed and the dock became the National Museum of Royal Barges in 1972.

Exhibition
 Boat and Barge: 
There are 8 of 52 important royal barges displayed in this museum

2. History

2.1 Evidence of Royal Barge and royal Barge Procession
	2.2 Battle formations
	2.3 Ceremonial Processions

3. Bangkok Period Royal Barge Heritage
	3.1 Building process
	3.2 Description of the figureheads
	3.3 The royal barge procession
	3.4 Relevance to Thai art history

4. Royal Barge Narai Song Suban – Rama IX
4.1 Detail of Royal Barge Narai Song Suban
	4.2 Building detail
	4.3 Royal ceremonies
	4.4 Initiation of the procession

5. Royal Barge Procession Chants
	5.1 The percussion instruments
	5.2 Meaning of the song

6. Royal Barge Suphannahong and the World Ship Prize.
	6.1 Full history of the Royal barge Suphannahong
	6.2 Art and craftsmanship
	6.3 Award

See also
Royal Barge Procession

References

Further reading

 Buapradit, R. (2009). Guide to the National Museum of the Royal Barges. (M. Samransuk, D. Kamalanon, & R. Buapradit, Trans.) Bangkok, Thailand: Amarin Printing

Museums in Bangkok
Royal Barges
Ships of Thailand
Bangkok Noi district
Maritime museums in Thailand